Finja is a locality situated in Hässleholm Municipality, Scania County, Sweden. Finja is located north of Lake Finjasjön, between Hässleholm and Tyringe. The village had a population of  535 inhabitants in 2010.

Finja Church 
Finja Church is in the parish of Tyringe in the Diocese of Lund. The church was constructed in the beginning of the 12th century in a romanesque style, but has since then gone through several alterations and repairs. The church tower was constructed later in the same century, and in 1664 it was equipped with stairs. Inside the church there are fresco paintings from the 1140s. The baptismal font in sandstone with palmette motifs. The altar dates from the 16th century, with canopy and columns with wood carvings.

References 

Populated places in Hässleholm Municipality
Populated places in Skåne County